This is a list of the equipment currently in use by the Bulgarian Land Forces.

Small arms

Sidearms

Assault rifles

Submachine guns

Sniper rifles

Machine guns

Anti-tank weapons

Mortars

Other small arms

Anti-tank guided missiles

Man-portable air defense systems

Armoured and utility vehicles

Artillery and air defense

Retired equipment 
 PT-76 amphibious tanks (250)
 T-62 tanks (250, sold to Ethiopia, Yemen and Angola)
 TV-62
 PTS
 T-55AM2 tanks (1,400 kept in storage in the province of Montana)
 T-34 tanks (177, some sold to Mali and other African countries; 42 kept in storage near the village of Ohrid, Bulgaria; some are used as anti-tank weapons targets; the rest of the tanks were scrapped)
 BRDM-1
 BTR-152
 BTR-40
 BTR-50PU
 SS-23 (8 launchers + 24 missiles, destroyed)
 FROG-7 (24 launchers + dozens of missiles, destroyed)
 Scud-B (36 launchers + dozens of missiles, destroyed)
 AT-1 Snapper anti-tank guided missiles
 BM-13 multiple rocket launchers

See also
 Defense industry of Bulgaria
 Bulgarian Armed Forces

References

External links
  or  The download link(s) to details of Bulgaria's military equipment, including the reserve as of 2013. Note: some of the reserve items are not listed on this page, such as the 430 T55's in reserve status.

equipment
Bulgaria